Weights and measures are units of measurement subject to governmental regulation, to ensure fairness and transparency.

Weights and Measures may also refer to:
Various Weights and Measures Acts
The International Bureau of Weights and Measures, the international standards organisation and its subsidiary
International Committee for Weights and Measures, the 18-member core group that meets every year and
General Conference on Weights and Measures, a larger group that meets only every four to six years
Weights and Measures (Spirit of the West album), 1997
Weights & Measures (Hyland album), 2011
On Weights and Measures (Epiphanius)

See also
Metrology